Leo Blanchard (born March 12, 1955, in Edmonton, Alberta) is a former professional Canadian football offensive lineman who played between 1979 and 1991 in the Canadian Football League, mainly for the Edmonton Eskimos, but also for the Calgary Stampeders.
Blanchard grew up in Edmonton, and played football in high school at Queen Elizabeth Composite High School. 
Blanchard played Canadian university football for the Alberta Golden Bears between 1977-78. He played for the Eskimos from 1979-87. He later worked as offensive line coach for the junior Victoria Rebels.

References

1955 births
Living people
Alberta Golden Bears football players
BC Lions players
Calgary Stampeders players
Canadian football offensive linemen
Edmonton Elks players
Players of Canadian football from Alberta
Canadian football people from Edmonton